Waterloo Station was a short-lived Australian television soap opera created by Reg Watson and produced by the Reg Grundy Organisation for the Nine Network in 1983.

Synopsis 
Waterloo Station focused on two sisters, both married to policemen, and their adult children starting careers in the police force. The main locations were a police station, a police training academy in Sydney, and a large boarding house that provided accommodation for several characters.

Waterloo Station was an attempt by Grundy's to reproduce for Channel Nine the success of their earlier shows The Restless Years and The Young Doctors which focused on youth situations. Like Crawford Productions' successful police series Cop Shop, Waterloo Station combined police procedural elements with domestic situations involving the police personnel and their families.

The series was recorded at the Eric Porter studios in North Sydney.

Cast  

 Ron Graham – Jack Edwards
 Sally Tayler – Sally Edwards
 Pam Western – Liz Edwards
 Danny Roberts – Trevor Brown
 Julianne White – Stacey Daniels
 John Bonney – George Logan
 Jenny Ludlam – Ann Logan
 Bartholomew John – Tony Harris
 Steven Grives – Steve Colby
 Malcolm Cork – David Keller
 Tex Morton – Harry McDowell
 Gerry Sont – Rick Thompson
 Paul Smith – Joey Daniels
 Jennifer West – Rosie Wallace
 Andrew Clarke – Chris Cooper
 Patrick Phillips – criminal

Episodes

Season 1 (1983–1984)

Home Media 
There is yet to be a DVD Release of Waterloo Station.

Screening 
The series was programmed against the popular new series Carson's Law in key markets including Melbourne, and achieved only mediocre ratings. It was cancelled after 40 episodes. Andrew Clarke, Danny Roberts and Sally Tayler all subsequently found greater success as regular cast members of another Grundy produced soap opera, Sons and Daughters.

After Waterloo Station, on 18 April 1983, Grundy launched Starting Out which featured youthful characters attempting to enter the medical profession. This series was similarly short-lived.

During late 1987 while “The Midday Show” was taking a summer Christmas holiday break Nine network Sydney replayed Waterloo Station TV series weekdays at 12pm followed at 1.00pm “Private Benjamin” US comedy TV series. It has never been replayed since on commercial or pay TV here in Australia.

References

External links
 

Australian television soap operas
Nine Network original programming
1983 Australian television series debuts
1984 Australian television series endings
English-language television shows
Television series produced by The Reg Grundy Organisation